Játékok (Hungarian: Games) is an ongoing collection of "pedagogical performance pieces" by György Kurtág. He has been writing them since 1973. Ten volumes had been published as of 2021 (by Editio Musica Budapest). Volumes I, II, III, V, VI, VII, IX and X are for piano solo. Volumes IV and VIII are for piano 4-hands or two pianos.

Volume I was essentially completed in 1973 but not published until 1979, by which time Volumes II, III and IV had also been composed. Volumes V and VI were published in 1997, Volume VII in 2003, Volume VIII in 2010, Volume IX in 2017, and Volume X in 2021.

Several pieces from the collection have started to be regularly performed, including a Prelude and Chorale, an Antiphon in F, and one called 3 in memoriam.

Concept
Kurtág began the composition of Játékok to try to recapture something of the spirit of a child's play. He started with a few ideas set out in the foreword to the first four volumes:

Recordings
 György Kurtág: Játékok Márta Kurtág and György Kurtág piano. With Bach transcriptions by Kurtág himself and his wife Márta. Recorded July 1996. ECM New Series 1619 (CD)
 György Kurtág: Játékok Valeria Szervánszky and Ronald Cavaye. The first complete recording of volumes 1 - 4. Recorded October 1992. (4 CDs - available on iTunes, Amazon, CD Baby, etc.)

Performances

György Kurtág and his wife Márta performed an always-renewing selection of pieces for two and four hands, including transcriptions. The later volumes of Játékok bear the sub-title Diary Entries and Personal Messages. This, to some extent, reveals the lineage of the unique microcosms, which irresistibly involve the listener at their recitals.

The couple played a selection as part of the Composer's Portrait of the Rheingau Musik Festival, 8 August 2004, in the "Kulturforum Schillerplatz" (now "ESWE Atrium") in Wiesbaden. The Bach transcriptions, interspersed with the miniature character pieces, were Aus tiefer Not (BWV 687), Sonatina from Actus Tragicus, Trio sonata in E major (BWV 525) and O Lamm Gottes (BWV 618).

They performed in Carnegie Hall’s Zankel Hall in February 2009.

References

External links
 ECM Records page on Játékok, accessed 4 Feb 2021

Compositions by György Kurtág
Compositions for solo piano
Compositions for piano four-hands
Contemporary classical compositions

Compositions that use extended techniques